Villar del Olmo is a municipality of the Community of Madrid, Spain. It is a town located east of the Community of Madrid, in the District of Las Vegas (although it is considered part of the Comarca de Alcalá). Its population is 1849 inhabitants (INE - 2005) and has an area of 28 km ². Per capita income data for 2003 is 8452 € / person.

Holidays 
 5 February: St. Agatha.
 15 May: San Isidro (patron).
 15 September : Our Lady of Solitude (fiestas).

Access 
From Madrid to the village can be reached by the A-3, exit 22 direction of Campo Real, or by the A-2 M-50 exit towards Valencia and the exit primaera Torrejón de Ardoz on the M-206. Continue direction Loeches, Pozuelo del Rey and New Baztán direction where there are already signs Villar del Olmo.

Education 
There is one kindergarten (public).

References

External links 
Ayuntamiento de Villar del Olmo

Municipalities in the Community of Madrid